Maurice (Mo) Stobbart (born 1915 in Aspatria, Cumberland, England - died 2001) was a speedway rider and promoter who started his career with York in 1931. He was the younger brother to Roland Stobbart

Biography

Pre-war events
Observers generally regard Maurice Stobbart as a pre- and post-war northern-based speedway rider. He began racing motor cycles with York in the 1931 season, moved to Preston at the start of the 1932 season then rode for the Wembley Lions in the 1933 season. Although he retired at the end of that season through a lack of success Roland coaxed him back into the sport in 1937 when he began promoting events at Workington, Carlisle and Ayr. In 1938-39 he rode for Newcastle Diamonds. In his very first race Stobbart broke the Newcastle track record by five seconds, a record that had stood since 1930. He entered six events that evening, he had four firsts, one second, and in the event not mentioned, he was leading when engine trouble robbed him of victory. Victories which earned him the opportunity to enter the qualifying round of the world Speedway championships.

Workington
Maurice began speedway racing at Workington in 1931; he was sixteen years of age. He demonstrated his ability in the very first event, when while taking a bend, he struck a post, burst his rear tyre but skilfully retained his balance. Although he often came to grief he showed tremendous promise and signed for York during that season. Returning to Workington in 1937 he equalled his brother’s long standing course and lap record on two occasions. He also won several Golden Helmets, Golden Sashes, Challenge Matches and Derwent Handicaps.

References

Bibliography

  
 

People from Aspatria
1915 births
2001 deaths
British speedway riders
English motorcycle racers
Speedway promoters
Wembley Lions riders
Newcastle Diamonds riders
Sportspeople from Cumbria